Statistics of League of Ireland in the 1968/1969 season.

Overview
It was contested by 12 teams, and Waterford won the championship for the 3rd time.

Final classification

Athlone Town and Finn Harps were elected to the league for next season, 1969/70.

Results

Top scorers

League of Ireland seasons
Ireland
1968–69 in Republic of Ireland association football